Aria the Scarlet Ammo is an anime television series produced by J.C.Staff, based on the light novel series written by Chūgaku Akamatsu and illustrated by Kobuichi. Set in a world where high school students known as Butei are equipped with firearms and assist in solving cases, a Butei named Kinji Tōyama has a chance encounter with Aria H. Kanzaki, a descendant of Sherlock Holmes. The series, directed by Takashi Watanabe and produced by J.C.Staff, aired in Japan between April 15 and July 1, 2011. An original video animation (OVA) episode was released on December 21, 2011. The anime is licensed in North America by Funimation, in Australia by Madman Entertainment, and in the United Kingdom by Manga Entertainment. The anime made its North American television debut on the Funimation Channel on November 27, 2012.

An anime adaptation of Aria the Scarlet Ammo AA, a spin-off manga series written by Shogako Tachibana, has been produced by Doga Kobo aired in Japan between October 6 and December 22, 2015. The series follows an E-ranked Butei named Akari Mamiya, who aims to become Aria's "Amica" and fight alongside her. The series is also licensed in North America by Funimation, who simulcast it as it aired.

Episode list

Aria the Scarlet Ammo (2011)

Aria the Scarlet Ammo AA (2015)

References

Aria the Scarlet Ammo